Anne Dunwoodie (born October 1949) is a female Scottish international lawn bowler and journalist.

Bowls career
In 2011 she won the triples gold medal at the Atlantic Bowls Championships with Lorna Smith and Mandy O'Donnell.

She writes for Bowls International and in 2010 was made an honorary life member of the Scottish Indoor Bowls Association.

References 

Scottish female bowls players
1949 births
Living people